Keith Vaughan Jones (born 28 March 1942) is a former English cricketer, who played over 100 matches in both first-class and List A cricket for Middlesex between 1967 and 1974. He was a right-handed batsman who bowled right-arm medium pace. He was born at Park Royal, Middlesex.

References

External links

1942 births
Living people
People from Park Royal
English cricketers
Middlesex cricketers
Bedfordshire cricketers
Minor Counties cricketers